Christopher John Kirubi (20 August 1941 – 14 June 2021), born in Murang'a county, was a Kenyan businessman, entrepreneur, and industrialist. He was a director at Centum Investment Company, a business conglomerate, of which he was the largest individual shareholder.

According to the 2011 Forbes annual rankings of Africa's richest people in Kenya, Kirubi was ranked the second richest man in Kenya and 31st richest in Africa with a net worth of $301 million in the 2011 Forbes inaugural ranking of Africa's 40 richest people. He ranked behind only the Kenyatta family, who were ranked richest in Kenya in 2011 with a net worth of $500 million. However, in 2012, Forbes dropped Kirubi from the list of Africa's 40 richest.

He chaired: (1) DHL Express Kenya Limited, (2) Haco Industries Kenya Limited, (3) Kiruna International Limited, (4) International House Limited, (5) Nairobi Bottlers Limited, (6) Sandvik East Africa Limited and (7) 98.4 Capital FM.  He was also a non-executive director of (8) Bayer East Africa Limited, (9) UAP Provincial Insurance Company Limited and (10) Beverage Services of Kenya Limited. He died on 14 June 2021 after a long battle with cancer.

Early life and education
Chris Kirubi was born in a poor family. Both of his parents died when he was young. He began work while still in school, working during school holidays to support himself and his siblings. Upon graduation, his first job was as salesman, repairing and selling gas cylinders for Shell, the petroleum conglomerate.

Career

During the 1960s and early 1970s, Kirubi worked as an Administrator at Kenatco, a government-owned transportation company. Starting around 1971, he began buying run-down buildings in the cities of Nairobi and Mombasa, renovating them and either selling the renovated structures or renting them out. He also began acquiring prime land in and around Nairobi, and proceeded to erect rental and other commercial properties, using loans from Kenyan financial institutions.

Holdings

Kirubi's investments included but are not limited to the following: (1) Centum Investment Company: Chris Kirubi was the largest single investor in the company, whose stock is listed on both the Nairobi Stock Exchange and on the Uganda Securities Exchange. (2) He owned 100 percent of Haco Industries Limited, a Kenyan household goods manufacturer. (3) 98.4 Capital FM, is a Nairobi radio station, whose shares he owned 100 percent (4) Kenya Commercial Bank Group and (5) Nation Media Group.

In March 2020, he filed an application seeking regulatory approval to acquire another 20 percent of Centum's shareholding, to add to the 30 percent that he already owned at that time. The deal involved the purchase of 133 million shares valued at KSh2.7 billion (US$25.7 million).

Former investments

At one time, Kirubi owned 9.58 percent of UAP Holdings, an investment and insurance conglomerate that provides investment and insurance services in the countries of Eastern and Central Africa. In 2015, he sold his shares to Old Mutual and exited the stock.

In May 2020, Haco Industries sold the BIC brand (stationery, lighters and shavers) to French conglomerate Société BIC. The deal brought to an end 40 years of Haco’s BIC franchise.

Philanthropy 
Chris Kirubi was involved in a youth mentorship programme dubbed Ask Kirubi. He drove his passion for empowering youth in Africa through online authorship and physical talks in High schools and Universities in Kenya.

Death 
Chris Kirubi died on 14 June 2021 after a long battle with colon cancer.

See also

References

External links
 Interview With Chris Kirubi As of January 2020.
 Kenyan Tycoon Chris Kirubi To Pocket $2.3 Million Centum Dividends As of 12 June 2019.
Meet the Boss: Chris Kirubi, businessman, Kenya
Inside the luxurious private jet that billionaire Chris Kirubi wants to buy
Chris Kirubi first Kenyan to drive Sh40 million luxurious Maybach Benz
Interview with Chris Kirubi As of September 2020

1941 births
2021 deaths
Kenyan businesspeople
INSEAD alumni
Harvard Business School alumni
University of Gothenburg alumni
Alumni of Friends School Kamusinga
Kenyan company founders
Kenyan business executives
People from Murang'a County
Deaths from cancer in Kenya
Centum Investment Company people